Eldon Beau Boulter (born February 23, 1942) is an American politician. From 1985 to 1989, he served two terms as a Republican member of the United States House of Representatives, representing the 13th district of Texas.

Biography 
Boulter was born in El Paso, Texas. He and his family moved to Levelland, Texas. He attended Levelland High School, graduating in 1960. Boulter attended the University of Texas at Austin, where he earned his bachelor's degree in 1965. He then attended Baylor Law School, graduating in 1968.

Career 
Boulter practiced law in Amarillo, Texas. He served as a member of the Amarillo City Commission.

Congress 
In 1985, Boulter was elected to represent the 13th district of Texas in the United States House of Representatives. He succeeded Jack Hightower. Before the win, Boulter was interviewed and he made declarations based on abortion and also other issues. 

In 1989, Boulter was succeeded by Bill Sarpalius. He was nominated to serve office for the United States Senate, but was unsuccessful.

References

External links 
 http://www.infoplease.com/biography/us/congress/boulter-eldon-beau.html
 https://web.archive.org/web/20090217065723/http://boulter.com/boulter/people.html
 http://bioguide.congress.gov/scripts/biodisplay.pl?index=B000666
 https://web.archive.org/web/20061108172637/http://elections.sos.state.tx.us/elchist.exe
Congressional Quarterly's Guide to U.S. Elections

1942 births
Living people
Politicians from El Paso, Texas
Republican Party members of the United States House of Representatives from Texas
University of Texas at Austin alumni
Baylor Law School alumni
Politicians from Amarillo, Texas
People from Levelland, Texas
Politicians from Falls Church, Virginia
20th-century American politicians
Members of Congress who became lobbyists